This is a list of earthquakes in 2017. Only earthquakes of magnitude 6 or above are included, unless they result in damage and/or casualties, or are notable for some other reason.  All dates are listed according to UTC time. Maximum intensities are indicated on the Mercalli intensity scale and are sourced from United States Geological Survey (USGS) ShakeMap data. Major events took place in Iran and Mexico, with the latter experiencing two such events, one of them exceeding magnitude 8.

Compared to other years

An increase in detected earthquake numbers does not necessarily represent an increase in earthquakes per se. Population increase, habitation spread, and advances in earthquake detection technology all contribute to higher earthquake numbers being recorded over time.

By death toll

Listed are earthquakes with at least 10 dead.

By magnitude

Listed are earthquakes with at least 7.0 magnitude.

By month

January

February

March

April

May

June

July

August

September

October

November

December

References

External links
ShakeMap Background – United States Geological Survey

2017
 
2017 natural disasters
2017-related lists
2017